The 2003 WGC-World Cup took place November 13–16 at the Kiawah Island Golf Resort, Ocean Course in Kiawah Island, South Carolina, U.S. It was the 49th World Cup and the fourth as a World Golf Championship event. 24 countries competed and each country sent two players. The prize money totaled $4,000,000 with $1,400,000 going to the winning pair. The South African team of Rory Sabbatini  and Trevor Immelman won. They won by four strokes stroke over the English team of Paul Casey and Justin Rose.

Qualification and format
18 teams qualified based on the Official World Golf Ranking and were joined by six teams via qualifiers in Singapore and Mexico.

The tournament was a 72-hole stroke play team event with each team consisting of two players. The first and third days were fourball play and the second and final days were foursomes play.

Teams

Source

Scores

Source

References

World Cup (men's golf)
Golf in South Carolina
WGC-World Cup
WGC-World Cup
World Cup golf